Llewellyn Heycock, Baron Heycock CBE (12 August 1905 – 13 March 1990) was a Welsh local politician, who became a life peer in 1967.

Heycock was born in Margam and began his career as an engine driver with the Great Western Railway.  He subsequently rose to a powerful position in South Wales local politics through his trade union connections and membership of the Labour Party, a "personality of transcendent authority".  Despite having himself received little formal education, he became Chairman of the Glamorganshire Education Committee.

He was first elected to Glamorgan County Council in 1937 at a by-election following the re-election of long-serving miners' agent John Thomas of Pontrhydyfen as an alderman. Heycock was chosen as Labour candidate at the expense of Joe Brown, a former mayor of Port Talbot and a close associate of Ramsay Macdonald when he was MP for Aberavon. Brown resigned from the Labour Party in protest and stood as an Independent. However, Heycock held the seat by 569 votes.

In April 1967 he was elected as a county councillor to Glamorgan County Council for the Port Talbot East ward. In 1973 he was elected unopposed as councillor for Margam Central on the new West Glamorgan County Council.

He became a Commander of the Order of the British Empire (CBE) in 1959, a Commander of the Order of the Hospital of St. John of Jerusalem (CStJ) in April 1967, and a life peer on 10 July 1967 as Baron Heycock, of Taibach in the Borough of Port Talbot.

References

External links
Hansard
Welsh Icons

1905 births
1990 deaths
Councillors in Wales
Labour Party (UK) life peers
Life peers created by Elizabeth II
Commanders of the Order of the British Empire
Commanders of the Order of St John
Members of Glamorgan County Council